The 401st Army Field Support Brigade is located at Camp Arifjan, Kuwait. The Army field support brigade (AFSB) is a small, mission tailored, modular organization assigned to the Army Sustainment Command (ASC). The primary role of the 401st AFSB is to facilitate sustainment, property accountability, and maintain general support to the U.S. Army, joint and multinational forces, including other U.S. government agencies across CENTCOM, the unified armed forces command organization that oversees US military operations in the Middle East. The 401st also provides a strategic logistics link from the national industrial base to the joint Warfighter in field operations. The AFSB plays a key role by supporting in large-scale combat operations. The 401st AFSB now commands four Army Field Support Battalions (AFSB) operating mostly in the Middle East. The 401st AFSB provides its headquarters, the Army Sustainment Command (ASC), and the Materiel Enterprise partners, provides a forward presence and missions in support of Operation Freedom’s Sentinel in Afghanistan. These include building and sustaining the CENTCOM joint Warfighter; providing property accountability; enhancing CENTCOM readiness, and providing strategic depth. The 401st AFSB also manages the Logistics Civilian Augmentation Program (LOGCAP), which provides essential combat support and combat service support tailored to the requirements identified by battlespace commanders. It is also involved in contracted field support maintenance; the Logistics Assistance Program; Theater Property Equipment; Army Preposition Stocks-5; support to Foreign Military Sales; and Life Cycle Management Command reach back support.

History  

The 401st traces its history back to the 1997 activation of the Combat Equipment Group-Southwest Asia (CEG-SWA). The command was formed as a result of the chief of staff of the U.S. Army decision to expand AMC’s responsibility for war reserve stocks to include the Persian Gulf region. While the unit created Army prepositioned stock sets in Qatar and Kuwait, it underwent a series of name and organizational changes. CEG-SWA was renamed AMC ForwardSWA on Oct. 1, 2000, when the unit assumed responsibility for the LAP (Logistics Assistance Program) and LOGCAP in Southwest Asia. AMC Forward began war support operations in Southwest Asia in October 2001, when it began to support U.S. forces in Afghanistan. The headquarters moved from Qatar to Kuwait in the fall of 2002 as part of the ramp up to Operation Iraqi Freedom. The unit was re-designated the Army Field Support Brigade-SWA on Oct. 1, 2004. At the time, the AFSB-SWA consisted of the Brigade Headquarters in Qatar; Army Field Support Battalion-Qatar; AFSBn-Kuwait; AFSBn-Afghanistan; prepositioned watercraft at Kuwait Naval Base; and the Logistics Support Element at Camp Arifjan, Kuwait. The AFSB-SWA was deactivated on Oct. 16, 2006, when the 401st AFSB was activated. In 2008, brigade headquarters forward deployed to Bagram Airfield. The battalions in Kuwait and Qatar transferred to the 402nd AFSB in 2010 to allow the 401st to focus on Afghanistan. In 2015 the 401st full moved their headquarters to Camp Arifjan, Kuwait and reintegrated the AFSBn's from Kuwait and Qatar back into their command. The 402nd AFSB then redeployed back to Hawaii.

Subordinate Units 
 AFSBn - Afghanistan 
 AFSBn - Kuwait 
 AFSBn - Qatar
 AFSBn - SWA

References

External links
Official website
401st Support Brigade at the Institute of Heraldry

Support 401